Coal Run Village (sometimes simply Coal Run) is a home rule-class city in Pike County, Kentucky, in the United States. Bordered to the north, south, and east by Pikeville, the population was 1,706 at the 2010 census. It was the fastest-growing city in Kentucky from 2007 to 2008, with a population increase of 17.3%.

Geography
Coal Run Village is located at  (37.519043, -82.566562).

Demographics

As of the 2010 United States Census, there were 1,706 people living in the city. The racial makeup of the city was 95.4% White, 1.1% Black, 0.1% Native American, 2.2% Asian, 0.1% from some other race and 0.5% from two or more races. 0.6% were Hispanic or Latino of any race.

As of the census of 2000, there were 577 people, 260 households, and 172 families living in the city. The racial makeup of the city was 93.93% White, 0.17% African American, 0.52% Native American, 3.12% Asian, 1.39% from other races, and 0.87% from two or more races. Hispanic or Latino of any race were 2.43% of the population.

There were 260 households, out of which 22.7% had children under the age of 18 living with them, 51.2% were married couples living together, 11.2% had a female householder with no husband present, and 33.8% were non-families. 31.2% of all households were made up of individuals, and 10.0% had someone living alone who was 65 years of age or older. The average household size was 2.15 and the average family size was 2.65.

In the city, the population was spread out, with 17.2% under the age of 18, 7.8% from 18 to 24, 27.6% from 25 to 44, 31.2% from 45 to 64, and 16.3% who were 65 years of age or older. The median age was 44 years. For every 100 females, there were 80.9 males. For every 100 females age 18 and over, there were 80.4 males.

The median income for a household in the city was $34,375, and the median income for a family was $42,639. Males had a median income of $31,071 versus $27,813 for females. The per capita income for the city was $27,469. About 17.1% of families and 24.4% of the population were below the poverty line, including 38.9% of those under age 18 and 33.8% of those age 65 or over.

Government

Coal Run Village is governed by a city commission form of government. The current mayor is Andrew H. Scott. The city commissioners are Mayor Pro-Tem Beverly Jo Osborne, Joe Adkins, Trey Deskins and Mike Steele.

References

External links
City of Coal Run Village
Pikeville-Pike County Tourism

 

Cities in Kentucky
Cities in Pike County, Kentucky
Populated places established in 1963